Kalophrynus interlineatus, commonly known as the spotted narrow-mouthed frog, is a species of narrow-mouthed frog found in India and South East Asia including Hong Kong.

Photos

References

Amphibians of Bangladesh
Amphibians of Myanmar
Amphibians of Cambodia
Amphibians of China
Fauna of Hong Kong
Frogs of India
Amphibians of Laos
Amphibians of Thailand
Amphibians of Vietnam
Amphibians described in 1855
Taxa named by Edward Blyth